In Freemasonry, a Mason at sight, or Mason on sight, is a non-Mason who has been initiated into Freemasonry and raised to the degree of Master Mason through a special application of the power of a Grand Master.

Procedure
The process of making a Mason at sight was listed by Albert Mackey as the eighth of his "Twenty-Five Landmarks of Freemasonry". 

The customary method for raising a person to Master Mason through the rare process of recognizing him a Mason at sight has the Grand Master creating a new lodge for the single purpose of initiating the candidate. This "occasional lodge" is then dissolved when the reason for its creation - the initiation of the candidate - has been completed. However, while the process of recognizing a Mason at sight usually involves this procedure, Masonic historian Louis L. Williams has observed that "using his unique and unquestionable power, the Grand Master could pretty well proceed as he might see fit" such as simply decreeing the individual to be a Master Mason.

Masons at sight
Early instances in the history of speculative Masonry, in which a man has been made a Mason at sight, include the raising of Francis Stephen, Duke of Lorraine, in 1731 at Houghton Hall, fourteen years before his accession as Holy Roman Emperor, and of Frederick, Prince of Wales in 1737.

William Howard Taft of the United States was recognized as a Mason at sight by an occasional lodge created for that purpose on February 18, 1909, a few weeks prior to his inauguration. The lodge was convened at about 4:00 p.m. at the Scottish Rite Cathedral in Cincinnati by Charles Hoskinson, the Grand Master of Ohio, and consisted of him and William B. Mellish. He dissolved it after 6:00 p.m.

Other notable persons who have been made a Mason at sight include Joseph Smith, founder of the LDS Church; General George C. Marshall, who was raised by the Grand Master of the Grand Lodge of the District of Columbia, General Douglas MacArthur (on January 17,  1936, in the presence of over six hundred Master Masons), and Don King, who was raised by Grand Master Odes J. Kyle Jr. of the Most Worshipful Prince Hall Grand Lodge of Ohio.

References

Freemasonry